Dubbins or Dubbin is a surname. Notable people with the name include

 Don Dubbins (1928–1991), American actor of film and television
 Tony Dubbins ( 1984–2008), British trade unionist
 Murray Dubbin (born 1929), American politician from Florida
 Sam Dubbin (born 1955), American lawyer, public servant, and advocate

See also
 Dubbin, wax product for leather and other materials